The Government of Sikkim also known as the State Government of Sikkim is the senior executive authority of the Indian state of Sikkim and its 6 districts, created by the National Constitution as the legislative, executive and judicial authority to govern the state. The Governor acts as the head of state and is, nominally, the highest figure of executive authority. However it is the Chief Minister who is the de facto head of government and chief executive.  

Gangtok is the capital of Sikkim, and houses the Vidhan Sabha (Legislative Assembly), the secretariat, and the Sikkim High Court.

The current Legislative Assembly of Sikkim is unicameral, consisting of 32 Member of the Legislative Assembly (M.L.A). Its term is 5 years, unless sooner dissolved.

Council of Ministers 

 Prem Singh Tamang, Chief Minister, Home Department, Excise Department, Finance 
 Kunga Nima Lepcha, Human Resource Development, Land Revenue and Disaster Management, Law & Legislative, Parliamentary Affairs.
 Sonam Lama, Rural Management and Development, Panchayati Raj and Cooperative and Ecclesiastical departments .
 Bedu Singh Panth, Tourism & Civil Aviation and Commerce & Industries.
 Lok Nath Sharma,  Information & Public Relation Department IPR, Food Security, Agriculture Development, Horticulture & Cash Crops Development, Irrigation & Flood Control and Animal Husbandry, Livestock Fisheries and Veterinary Services
 Sanjeet Kharel, Sikkim Public Works (Buildings & Housing ) and Transport Dept.
 Arun Upreti, Urban Development and Housing Development, Food, Civil Supplies and Consumer Affairs
 Bhim Hang Limboo, Water Supply & Public Health Engineering and Water Resources and River Development departments.
 Karma Loday Bhutia, Forest, Environment & Wildlife Management, Mines, Minerals & Geology and Science & Technology.
 Mani Kumar Sharma, Healthcare, Human Services & Family Welfare and Social Justice, Empowerment and Welfare departments
 Samdup Lepcha, Public Works (Road and Bridges), Cultural Affairs and Heritage departments
 M.N. Sherpa, Energy and power, Labour department.

References

1st Session of 10th SLA https://voiceofsikkim.com/2019/06/03/1st-session-of-10th-sla-session-concludes-opp-sdf-mlas-staged-walk-out/ 
Cabinet Ministers of 2019 wef 27 May 2019 https://voiceofsikkim.com/2019/05/31/portfolios-assigned-to-skm-ministers/